The name Sigar can refer to four people in Scandinavian mythology, surrounding the legends of Sigurd the dragon slayer. One of them only appears as the friend of Helgi Hjörvarðsson in the eddic lay Helgakviða Hjörvarðssonar. The other two appear as the villainous members of the same clan in several sources.

Icelandic sources
Snorri Sturluson writes in the Skáldskaparmál that two Sigars belong to the same clan, the Siklings, and that they are the relatives of Siggeir, the villainous Geatish king in the Völsunga saga.

In Hversu Noregr byggðist, it is given in more detail that Sigar the elder had two sons, Sigmund and Siggeir who killed Völsung. Sigmund had the son Sigar the younger, who killed Hagbard.

It is told in the Völsunga saga that Sigar the younger was in a feud with Hagbard and Haki and his sons. He had kidnapped one of Haki's daughters and murdered a second:

Sigar the younger is also mentioned in Háleygjatal (as quoted in Ynglinga saga), where a gallows is referred to as "Sigar's steed" (Sigars jó):

Gesta Danorum
In Gesta Danorum (book 7), Saxo tells that Sigar had a daughter named Signy. Sigar was in a feud with Haki's brother Hagbard, but was informed by Signy's handmaid, that Hagbard had a secret love affair with Signy. Sigar decided to hang Hagbard, who, however, managed to inform Signy of this. Signy set her house on fire and succumbed in the flames while Hagbard executed himself in the gallows. Sigar tried in vain to save both Hagbard and Signy but failed. His only consolation was to bury the treacherous maid alive.

Gesta Danorum disagrees with the other sources by presenting Sigar as the son of Sywaldus, who was the son of Yngwin, a Geatish king who became the king of Denmark.

References

Legendary Norsemen
Kings of the Geats